Avaruarachne is a genus of jumping spiders containing the single species, Avaruarachne satchelli. It was first described by Danniella Sherwood in 2021. and has only been found in Cook Islands.

References

Salticidae
Spiders of Oceania